Saw Pale was duchess of Taungdwin. She was the only daughter of Queen Yadanabon and King Thihathu. Her mother was a commoner concubine but was raised to queen by her father after her birth. She had one elder brother Saw Yun, who later became king of Sagaing. Pale was married off to Gov. Thihapate I of Taungdwin (known as "Pwint Hla Oo Thihapate") in 1317, ending the planned rebellion by Thihapate. Her son Saw Hnaung became a leading general in the reign of King Swa Saw Ke of Ava.

References

Bibliography
 

Pinya dynasty
14th-century Burmese women